The Twelve Months or Twelve Months may refer to:

The Twelve Months (fairy tale)
The Twelve Months (1956 film), 1956 film
The Twelve Months (1972 film), 1972 film
Twelve Months (1980 film), 1980 film
The Twelve Months (2004 film), an Australian film (2004)
Twelve Months, the planned upcoming 18th The Dresden Files novel